Dr. Saeb N. Jaroudi (Arabic: صائب جارودي) was the former Minister of National Economy, Industry, and Tourism in Lebanon and a senior economic consultant advising international public and private institutions on economic policy and project finance. He held a number of leadership roles in the Arab world, Europe, and the United States throughout his career. He also served on several Boards and was a long-standing member of the Board of Directors of Arab Finance Corporation.

He was elected as the first Chairman of the Board and President of the Kuwait-based Arab Fund for Economic and Social Development by the Arab Ministers of Finance. He established the Fund as the regional development bank of the Arab world, initiating and financing major national and inter-country industrial, agriculture, rural development, power, water, education, and healthcare projects. During his tenure, he also initiated the establishment of the Arab Monetary Fund and the Arab Authority for Agricultural Investment and Development.

As minister in Saeb Salam's first cabinet during president Suleiman Frangieh's mandate, Dr. Jaroudi introduced policies that successfully stimulated the development of lesser developed regions of the country, encouraged the flow of foreign direct investment into the country and increased exports through bilateral trade agreements. To promote investment in Lebanon’s industrial sector, he developed and led a pioneering matchmaking program with the United Nations Industrial Development Organization (UNIDO), which culminated in the signing of 20 new joint venture projects between Lebanese and foreign investors.

His strong United Nations ties began when he joined the UN’s Center for Development Planning in New York as a Senior Economist. During a decade-long UN career, he assisted in the establishment and implementation of several Arab countries’ national development plans. He also assisted the Kuwaiti government in establishing the Kuwait Fund for Arab Economic Development and driving its operations during its early years.

Fresh from completing his Master's degree at the University of California, Berkeley and his PhD Studies at Columbia University, Dr. Jaroudi began his professional experience teaching Economics at the American University of Beirut, where he also participated in the pioneering work of the Economic Research Institute on economic development and business legislation in the Middle East.

In recognition of his contributions to the economic and social advancement of developing countries, Dr. Jaroudi was elected as a member of the United Nations Committee for Development Policy and UNESCO’s International Fund for the Promotion of Culture. He also served as a member of the Board of Trustees of the Arab British Chamber of Commerce Foundation, the British Lebanese Association, The Arab British Centre and International College in Lebanon. He was also an elected fellow of The Royal Numismatic Society (RNS), a learned society and charity based in London, United Kingdom whose patron as of 2014 was Queen Elizabeth II.

On September 18, 2014, upon the request of the Lebanese Prime Minister Tammam Salam, he was honored by a minute of silence by the Lebanese Council of Ministers at the start of the cabinet meeting.

References

1929 births
2014 deaths
Columbia University alumni
Government ministers of Lebanon
Tourism ministers of Lebanon
Politicians from Beirut